Achadinha is a parish in the municipality of Nordeste, Azores, Portugal.

Achadinha may refer also refer to:

A hamlet in the village of Boaventura in the municipality of São Vicente, Azores, Portugal
A hamlet in the parish of Camacha in the municipality of Santa Cruz, Madeira, Portugal
A hamlet of the parish of Gaula, Madeira, Portugal
Achadinha do Pico, a hamlet in the parish of Gaula, Madeira, Portugal
A subdivision of the parish of Porto da Cruz, Madeira, Portugal
Achadinha (Praia) - a city district of Praia, Cape Verde 
Achadinha Pires, a city district of Praia, Cape Verde